The 2020 COSAFA Under-17 Championship is the 9th edition of the COSAFA U-17 Championship, a football tournament organized by the Council of Southern Africa Football Associations (COSAFA) involving teams from Southern Africa for players aged 17 and below. The tournament is also the qualifier for the 2021 Africa U-17 Cup of Nations, which in turn is the qualifier for the 2021 FIFA U-17 World Cup and will be played on November 19–29 in Nelson Mandela Bay and the two finalists of the tournament will be representing COSAFA in the Africa U-17 Cup of Nations. Initially, it was planned to be played in Malawi in July but was postponed due to the COVID-19 pandemic. After the first four games, (2 in each group), the tournament was re-started as four teams (Comoros, Zimbabwe, Botswana, Eswatini) were disqualified for using over-aged players.

Participating teams
Last year's runners-up Mozambique were meant to be the 9th nation to participate, but in the end 8 of the 14 COSAFA teams entered to compete for this year's trophy. After the first round of games four teams were expelled due to cheating, namely:

So the tournament restarted with the following genuine combatants:

 (Hosts)
 (Defending champions)

Match Officials 

Referees
  Audrick Nkole (Zambia)
  (Ms) Vistoria Nuusiku Shangula (Namibia) 
  Godfrey Nkhakananga (Malawi)
  Thulani Sibandze  (Eswatini)
  Luxolo Badi (South Africa)
  Lawrence Zimondi (Zimbabwe)
  Tshepo Mokani Gobagoba (Botswana)
  Artur Adriano Alfinar (Mozambique)
  (Ms) Thank Nyahuye (Zimbabwe)

Assistant Referees
  (Ms) Mercy Zulu (Zambia)
  Thomas Kaela (Zambia)
  (Ms) Buyisile Patricia Mkhaliphi  (Eswatini)
  Venestancio Cossa (Mozambique)
  Tafadzwa Nkala (Zimbabwe)
  Lucky Kegakologetswe (Botswana)
  Shaun Siza Dlangamandla (Lesotho)

Group stage

Third place match

Final

Qualification for CAF Cup of Nations
The two finalists of the tournament will qualify for the 2021 Africa U-17 Cup of Nations. Qualified nations:

Champion

Top Scorers

COSAFA-La Liga partnership
South Africa's Mduduzi Shabalala and Zambia's Joseph Banda was selected by the Technical Study Group to be traveling to Spain for a LaLiga development experience, where they will get the opportunity to observe the football life in Spain and train with a local team. The duo become the first players along with their two counterparts from 2020 COSAFA Women's U17 Championship to get this opportunity on account of the new formalization of the partnership between COSAFA and La Liga to boost Southern African football

Disqualification
Prior the tournament, CAF scanned all players with MRI, to make sure that everyone was eligible for the age-category. In the tournament regulations there is stated that the scanning will take place and a team that have players that do not pass the eligibility test will be disqualified and sent home as soon as possible. The test that is used world wide to measure eligibility for U17 tournaments focus on bone fusions in the wrist that are unlikely (with 99% accuracy rate) to appear before the age of 17.

Comoros, Zimbabwe, Botswana, Eswatini, were all found to have one or more players too old to participate in the tournament whereby the teams were disqualified. Because of this, it was decided to re-start the tournament with the other four teams and regard the already played games as warm-up for the tournament without any result value. The tournament were decided to be played as a round-robin where the top two qualify for the final (as well as the 2021 Africa U-17 Cup of Nations) and the bottom two qualify for the bronze medal game.

Original draw
The teams were on the 2nd of November drawn from 2 different pots, as the top-seeded teams were placed in one group each. After drawing the first two teams from pot 1 the last team were put together with the teams from pot 2 to draw the last two teams to each group.

Abandoned Group stage

Group A

Group B

Abandoned Knockout stage

References

External links
 Official website

COSAFA Under-17 Championship
International association football competitions hosted by South Africa
2020 in African football